Stuart Lenox Clarkson (July 4, 1919 – October 26, 1957)  was a linebacker for the Chicago Bears from 1942–51. He was the last pick in the 1942 NFL Draft.

Clarkson was a two-time Little All-American at Texas A&I University (now Texas A&M-Kingsville), 1938 and 1939. He was  posthumously named to the Texas A&M-Kingsville Football Hall of Fame, 1972, and was named to the Texas A&M-Kingsville Football Team of Century in 2000.

As a member of the 1946 World Champion Chicago Bears, he received an equal players share of $1,975.82. Following his tenure with the Chicago Bears, Clarkson was line coach and player for the Winnipeg Blue Bombers of the Canadian Football League from 1952 to 1953. From 1943–45, Clarkson served with the United States Army in England, France and Germany. On June 6, 1944, Clarkson was part of the American forces landing at Utah Beach, Normandy, France.

On October 26, 1957, while coaching during a game for the Sugar Land (Texas) High School football team, Clarkson suffered a heart attack and died on the side of the field. Sugar Land went on to beat Hitchcock High, 25–0. Clarkson had 2 sons.

References

External links
       

1919 births
1957 deaths
Chicago Bears players
Players of American football from Texas
Sportspeople from Corpus Christi, Texas
Texas A&M–Kingsville Javelinas football players
Winnipeg Blue Bombers players
United States Army personnel of World War II